The 2000 Tipperary Senior Hurling Championship was the 110th staging of the Tipperary Senior Hurling Championship since its establishment by the Tipperary County Board in 1887. The championship began on 9 September 2000 and ended on 15 October 2000.

Toomevara were the defending champions.

On 15 October 2000, Toomevara won the title after a 2-10 to 0-11 defeat of Thurles Sarsfields in the final at Semple Stadium. It was their 16th championship title overall and their third title in succession.

Paddy O'Brien from Toomevara and Johnny Enright from Thurles Sarsfields were the championship joint top scorers.

Results

Quarter-finals

Semi-finals

Final

Championship statistics

Top scorers

Top scorer overall

Top scorers in a single game

External links

 Credit Unions County Senior Hurling Championship 2000

References

Tipperary Senior Hurling Championship
Tipperary